A doppelgänger, doppelgaenger or doppelganger is a biologically unrelated look-alike, or a double, of a living person.

In fiction and mythology, a doppelgänger is often portrayed as a ghostly or paranormal phenomenon and usually seen as a harbinger of bad luck. Other traditions and stories equate a doppelgänger with an evil twin. In modern times, the term twin stranger is occasionally used.

Spelling
The word doppelganger is a loanword from the German, literally meaning double-walker. The singular and plural forms are the same in German, but English writers usually prefer the plural "doppelgangers". In German, there is also a female form, "Doppelgängerin" (plural: "Doppelgängerinnen"). The first known use, in the slightly different form Doppeltgänger, occurs in the novel Siebenkäs (1796) by Jean Paul, in which he explains his newly coined word in a footnote; the word  also appears in the novel, but with a different meaning.

In German, the word is written (as is usual with German nouns) with an initial capital letter: . In English, the word is generally written with a lower-case letter, and the umlaut on the letter "a" is usually dropped: "doppelganger".

Mythology
English-speakers have only recently applied this German word to a paranormal concept. Francis Grose's, Provincial Glossary of 1787 used the term fetch instead, defined as the "apparition of a person living." Catherine Crowe's book on paranormal phenomena, The Night-Side of Nature (1848) helped make the German word well-known. However, the concept of alter egos and double spirits has appeared in the folklore, myths, religious concepts, and traditions of many cultures throughout human history.

In Ancient Egyptian mythology, a ka was a tangible "spirit double" having the same memories and feelings as the person to whom the counterpart belongs. The Greek Princess presents an Egyptian view of the Trojan War in which a ka of Helen misleads Paris, helping to stop the war. This memic sense also appears in Euripides' play Helen, and in Norse mythology, a vardøger is a ghostly double who is seen performing the person's actions in advance. In Finnish mythology, this pattern is described as having an etiäinen, "a firstcomer".

In Joseph Wright's English Dialect Dictionary, it was listed as a North Country term and as obsolete.

Examples of alleged doppelgängers

John Donne
Izaak Walton claimed that John Donne, the English metaphysical poet, saw his wife's doppelgänger in 1612 in Paris, on the same night as the stillbirth of their daughter. This account first appears in the edition of Life of Dr. Rizvan Rizing published in 1675, and is attributed to "a Person of Honour... told with such circumstances, and such asseveration, that... I verily believe he that told it to me, did himself believe it to be true."

R. C. Bald and R. E. Bennett questioned the veracity of Walton's account.

Percy Bysshe Shelley
On July 8, 1822, the English poet Percy Bysshe Shelley drowned in the Bay of Spezia near Lerici in Italy. On August 15, while staying at Pisa, Percy's wife Mary Shelley, an author and editor, wrote a letter to Maria Gisborne in which she relayed Percy's claims to her that he had met his own doppelgänger. A week after Mary's nearly fatal miscarriage, in the early hours of June 23 Percy had had a nightmare about the house collapsing in a flood, and also

Percy Shelley's drama Prometheus Unbound (1820) contains the following passage in Act I: "Ere Babylon was dust, / The Magus Zoroaster, my dead child, / Met his own image walking in the garden. / That apparition, sole of men, he saw. / For know there are two worlds of life and death: / One that which thou beholdest; but the other / Is underneath the grave, where do inhabit / The shadows of all forms that think and live / Till death unite them and they part no more...."

Johann Wolfgang von Goethe
Near the end of Book XI of his autobiography, Dichtung und Wahrheit ("Poetry and Truth") (1811–1833), Goethe wrote, almost in passing:

Amid all this pressure and confusion I could not forego seeing Frederica once more. Those were painful days, the memory of which has not remained with me. When I reached her my hand from my horse, the tears stood in her eyes; and I felt very uneasy. I now rode along the foot-path toward Drusenheim, and here one of the most singular forebodings took possession of me. I saw, not with the eyes of the body, but with those of the mind, my own figure coming toward me, on horseback, and on the same road, attired in a dress which I had never worn, — it was pike-gray [hecht-grau], with somewhat of gold. As soon as I shook myself out of this dream, the figure had entirely disappeared. It is strange, however, that, eight years afterward, I found myself on the very road, to pay one more visit to Frederica, in the dress of which I had dreamed, and which I wore, not from choice, but by accident. However, it may be with matters of this kind generally, this strange illusion in some measure calmed me at the moment of parting. The pain of quitting for ever noble Alsace, with all I had gained in it, was softened; and, having at last escaped the excitement of a farewell, I, on a peaceful and quiet journey, pretty well regained my self-possession. 

This is an example of a doppelgänger which was perceived by the observer to be both benign and reassuring.

Émilie Sagée
Émilie Sagée, a French teacher working in 1845 in a boarding school in what is now Latvia, supposed to had the ability to produce a Doppelgänger. The story is reported by Robert Dale Owen.

George Tryon
A Victorian age example was the supposed appearance of Vice-Admiral Sir George Tryon. He was said to have walked through the drawing room of his family home in Eaton Square, London, looking straight ahead, without exchanging a word to anyone, in front of several guests at a party being given by his wife on 22 June 1893 while he was supposed to be in a ship of the Mediterranean Squadron, manoeuvering off the coast of Syria. Subsequently, it was reported that he had gone down with his ship, HMS Victoria, the very same night, after it collided with HMS Camperdown following an unexplained and bizarre order to turn the ship in the direction of the other vessel.

Twin strangers
With the advent of social media, there have been several reported cases of people finding their "twin stranger" online, a modern term for a doppelgänger. There are several websites where users can upload a photo of themselves and facial recognition software attempts to match them with another user of like appearance. Some of these sites report that they have found numerous living doppelgängers.

Examples in fiction

Examples in literature
Lord Byron uses doppelgänger imagery to explore the duality of human nature.

In The Devil's Elixir (1815), a man murders the brother and stepmother of his beloved princess, finds his doppelgänger has been sentenced to death for these crimes in his stead, and liberates him, only to have the doppelgänger murder the object of his affection. This was one of E. T. A. Hoffmann's early novels.

In addition to describing the doppelgänger double as a counterpart to the self, Percy Bysshe Shelley's drama Prometheus Unbound (1820) makes reference to Zoroaster meeting "his own image walking in the garden".

Fyodor Dostoyevsky's novel The Double (1846) presents the doppelgänger as an opposite personality who exploits the character failings of the protagonist to take over his life. Charles Williams's Descent into Hell (1939) has character Pauline Anstruther seeing her own doppelgänger all through her life. Clive Barker's story "Human Remains" in his Books of Blood is a doppelgänger tale, and the doppelgänger motif is a staple of Gothic fiction.

Jorge Luis Borges' The Other (1972) has the author himself find that he's sitting on a bench with his older doppelgänger, and the two have a conversation.

Vladimir Nabokov's novel Despair (1936) involves the narrator and protagonist of the story, Hermann Karlovich, an owner of a chocolate factory, who meets a homeless man in the city of Prague, who he believes is his doppelgänger.

In Bret Easton Ellis's novel, Glamorama (1998), protagonist actor–model Victor Ward ostensibly has a doppelgänger that people mistake for Ward, often claiming to have seen him at parties and events Ward has no recollection of attending. At one point in the novel, Victor heads to Europe but reports of him attending events in the states appear in newspaper headlines. However, Victor's doppelgänger may or may not have been placed by Victor's father, a United States senator looking to present a more intelligent and sophisticated replacement for his son that would improve his own image and boost his poll numbers for future elections. While the novel is narrated by Victor, various chapters are ambiguous, leading the reader to wonder if certain chapters are being narrated by the doppelgänger instead.

In Tana French's 2008 novel, The Likeness, detective Cassie Maddox has doppelgänger Lexie Madison who adopts the same alias Maddox used in an undercover investigation.

In Stephen King's book The Outsider (2018), the antagonist is able to use the DNA of individuals to become their near perfect match through a science-fictional ability to transform physically. The allusion to it being a doppelgänger is made by the group trying to stop it from killing again. The group also discusses other examples of fictional doppelgängers that supposedly occurred throughout history to provide some context.

Examples in film
In Das Mirakel and The Miracle (both 1912) the Virgin Mary (as Doppelgängerin) takes the place of a nun who has run away from her convent in search of love and adventure. Both based on the 1911 play The Miracle by Karl Vollmöller.

The Student of Prague (1913) is a German silent film where a diabolical character steals the reflection of a young student out of his mirror, leading it to return later and terrorise him.

Animator Jack King creates a doppelgänger for Donald Duck in Donald's Double Trouble (1946), where the twofold fowl speaks perfectly intelligible English and is well-mannered.

The 1969 film Doppelgänger involves a journey to the far side of the sun, where the astronaut finds a counter-earth, a mirror image of home. He surmises his counterpart is at that moment on his Earth in the same predicament.

Joseph Losey’s 1976 film Mr. Klein stars Alain Delon as an art dealer in Nazi-occupied Paris who receives a Jewish newspaper addressed to him. When the police suspect him as a member of the resistance, he begins a relentless pursuit of his supposed doppelgänger.

English actor Roger Moore plays a man haunted by a doppelgänger, who springs to life following a near-death experience, in Basil Dearden's The Man Who Haunted Himself (1970).

In the Soviet crime comedy film Gentlemen of Fortune (1971), Evgeny Troshkin (Yevgeny Leonov), a kind kindergarten teacher who has the same appearance as the wanted criminal known as "Docent", is sent on a mission to help Militsiya find an ancient golden helmet that Docent has hidden.

The 1972 Robert Altman film Images has a doppelgänger for the hallucinating character played by Susanna York.

The 1991 French/Polish film, La double vie de Véronique (Polish: Podwójne życie Weroniki), directed by Krzysztof Kieślowski and starring Irène Jacob, explores the mysterious connection between two women, both played by Jacob, who share an intense emotional connection in spite of never having met one another.

Doppelgängers are a major theme and plot element in the 2006 film, The Prestige, directed by Christopher Nolan and starring Hugh Jackman and Christian Bale. Illusionists Robert Angier (Jackman) and Alfred Borden (Bale) compete with each other to perfect a magic trick in which the performer appears to transport across the stage instantaneously. Angier initially performs the trick with a lookalike (also portrayed by Jackman), but later uses a machine that allows him to create an unlimited number of clones of himself. In the final scene, it is revealed that Borden had also been using a doppelgänger to perform the trick; the character "Borden" was actually two identical-looking men who took turns living out Borden's public life in order to create the illusion that they were a single man.

In the 2007 children's film, Bratz Kidz: Sleep-over Adventure, one of the stories involves Sasha being tormented and replaced by a doppelgänger she finds in a house of mirrors.

In the 2008 psychological horror film Lake Mungo, the film's climax contains a scene in which a young teenager, named Alice, is attacked by her disfigured doppelgänger, meant as a premonition of her soon-to-be death.

In Richard Ayoade's The Double (2013), based on Fyodor Dostoevsky's novel of the same name, a man is troubled by a doppelgänger who is employed at his place of work and affects his personal and professional life.

Denis Villeneuve's Enemy (2013) tells the story of a troubled history professor who, while watching a film, discovers an actor who is physically identical to himself. The two men's lives begin to intertwine and blur the boundaries of individual identity.

Estranged couple Ethan and Sophie find doubles of themselves trapped in the retreat house their marriage counselor recommended in Charlie McDowell's The One I Love (2014).

The 2018 science fiction film Annihilation features a doppelgänger in the climax.

Jordan Peele's horror film Us (2019) finds the Wilson family attacked by doubles of themselves known as "the Tethered".

Examples in television

In the episode "Mirror Image" of the first series of The Twilight Zone (originally aired Feb. 25, 1960), a young woman repeatedly sees her double in a New York Bus Terminal. After she is taken off to an asylum, the episodes ends with a second character trying to catch his double.

The plot of the "Firefall" episode of Kolchak: The Night Stalker (originally aired Nov. 8, 1974) revolves around the spirit of a deceased arsonist that becomes the doppelganger of a renowned orchestra conductor. He starts killing off people close to the conductor (by spontaneous human combustion), with the ultimate goal of taking over the conductor's body.

The Hammer House of Horror episode "The Two Faces of Evil" (originally aired Nov. 29, 1980), focuses on the part of the doppelganger mythology where meeting yours is a harbinger of your imminent death.

In the season two finale of Twin Peaks — "Beyond Life and Death" (originally aired Jun. 10, 1991) — Special Agent Dale Cooper encounters a variety of doppelgängers in the Black Lodge, one of whom is a malevolent version of himself. Cooper's doppelganger switches places with the him at the conclusion of the episode, trapping the original in the Black Lodge. A total of three different doppelgängers are dispatched from the mysterious Black Lodge to bedevil the forces of good in Showtime's 2017 series Twin Peaks: The Return.

In the episode "Miami Twice" of the sitcom Only Fools and Horses (originally aired Dec. 25, 1991), protagonists Del Boy and Rodney Trotter come into conflict with the family of mafia boss Don Vincenzo Ochetti, who is a doppelganger for Del Boy. Ochetti's family plot to have Del assassinated in public view to fake the death of Ochetti so that he will escape his coming murder trial, though Del and Rodney see through the ruse and eventually provide the authorities with evidence to have Ochetti proven guilty and sent to prison.

In Buffy the Vampire Slayer'''s season three episode "Doppelgangland" (originally aired Feb. 23, 1999), Willow encounters her vampire double who was first introduced seven episodes prior (in "The Wish" (Dec. 8, 1998)). In the fifth season episode "The Replacement" (Oct. 10, 2000), Xander discovers his own doppelgänger (portrayed by the actor's identical twin brother).

In the eighth season episode "Mr. Monk Is Someone Else" of Monk (originally aired Aug. 28, 2009), the titular detective is recruited to impersonate a dead mob hit man who was his double.

In the sitcom How I Met Your Mother, throughout the fifth and sixth seasons (aired 2009–2011), the five main characters each encounter an identical stranger of themself. By the episode "Double Date", they have spotted Marshall's doppelgänger, who they nickname "Moustache Marshall", and Robin's ("Lesbian Robin"). In the same episode they find Lily's doppelgänger, a Russian stripper named Jasmine. Later, in the episode "Robots Versus Wrestlers", the gang finds Ted's double, a Mexican wrestler, but Ted himself is not there to witness it. In "Doppelgangers", Lily and Marshall decide that as soon as they find Barney's doppelgänger, it will be a sign from the universe for them to start trying to have children. Lily spots a pretzel vendor whom she thinks looks like Barney, but in reality looks nothing like him. Marshall takes this mistake as Lily subconsciously affirming her desire for motherhood and they decide to start trying for a baby. They meet Barney's real doppelgänger — Dr. John Stangel — in the episode "Bad News", though they initially believe him to be Barney in disguise.

In the CW supernatural drama series, The Vampire Diaries (aired 2009–2017), actress Nina Dobrev portrayed the roles of several doppelgängers; Amara (the first doppelgänger), Tatia (the second), Katerina Petrova/Katherine Pierce (the third) and Elena Gilbert (the fourth). The series mainly focused on the doppelgängers of the sweet & genuine Elena and the malevolent Katherine. In the same series, Paul Wesley portrays Stefan Salvatore and his doppelgängers Tom Avery and Silas.

Starting with the second season of The Flash, doppelgangers play a key role in the development of the series. Doubles from various earths in the multiverse are defined as such. The person with multiple counterparts who appeared in the series was Harrison Wells.

The third episode of the fourth season of Elementary, an American procedural drama television series that presents a contemporary update of Sir Arthur Conan Doyle's character Sherlock Holmes, has a focus on the doppelgänger phenomenon. In the episode "Tag, You're Me" (originally aired Nov. 19, 2015), the victims of Sherlock Holmes's latest case found each other via a doppelgänger-finding website. One of the victims, and the culprit of another case investigated in the same episode, had searched for their twin strangers in order to dodge a DNA test for a crime they had committed years before.

Examples in music videos
The theme of doppelgänger has been frequently used in music videos, such as Aqua's "Turn Back Time" (1998), Dido's "Hunter" (2001), Madonna's "Die Another Day" (2002), Kelly Rowland's "Commander" (2010), and Britney Spears's "Hold It Against Me" (2011).

Examples in video games
The 1995 video game Alone in the Dark 3 features a nameless enemy that Edward Carnby calls "his double", a doppelgänger that mirrors the protagonist's moves to stop him from climbing the Water Tank. He is fused to Carnby after they touch hands.

The 1997 Konami game Castlevania: Symphony of the Night features an enemy boss known simply as "Doppelganger", a duplicate of the main protagonist Alucard. The enemy mimics the movement and attack patterns of the player.

The 2005 Capcom game Devil May Cry 3: Dante's Awakening also features an enemy boss known as "Doppelganger" that is fought near the end of the game. Resembling Dante's Devil Trigger form, it also mimics several of Dante's moves. Upon defeating the demon boss, Dante acquires a style "referred to as the Doppelganger style" that allows him to create a shadow copy of himself to assist him in battle in exchange for consuming Dante's Devil Trigger Gauge.

The 2008 video game Tomb Raider: Underworld features a character known as the "Doppelgänger." She is a clone of protagonist Lara Croft, created by antagonist Jacqueline Natla to bypass a retinal scanner in the security system of Croft's mansion. The Doppelgänger burns down the mansion and becomes a major antagonist and boss in the game. In a 2009 DLC expansion pack called "Lara's Shadow," Croft takes control of the Doppelgänger, and becoming the player character for this level.

The 2010 video game Alan Wake and its 2012 sequel Alan Wake's American Nightmare feature the character of Mr. Scratch, a doppelgänger of protagonist Alan Wake created as a supernatural manifestation of negative rumors spread about the character after his disappearance at the end of the first game, and who seeks to take over and ruin Wake's life.

The 2015 and 2017 Touhou games Urban Legend in Limbo and Antinomy of Common Flowers feature the character of Sumireko Usami, whose legendary attack is labeled as Doppelganger.

Scientific applications
Research has found that people who are "true" look-alikes have more similar genes than people who do not look like each other. They share genes affecting not only the face but also some phenotypes of physique and behavior, also indicating that (their) differences in the epigenome and microbiome contribute only modestly to human variability in facial appearance.

Heautoscopy is a term used in psychiatry and neurology for the hallucination of "seeing one's own body at a distance". It can occur as a symptom in schizophrenia and epilepsy, and is considered a possible explanation for doppelgänger phenomena.

Criminologists find a practical application in the concepts of facial familiarity and similarity due to the instances of wrongful convictions based on eyewitness testimony. In one case, a person spent 17 years behind bars persistently denying any involvement with the crime of which he was accused. He was finally released after someone was found who shared a striking resemblance and the same first name.

See also
 Alter ego
 Bilocation
 Capgras delusion
 Changeling
 Cloning
 Doppelganger week 
 Gothic double 
 Multiverse
 Pareidolia
 Shapeshifting
 Syndrome of subjective doubles
 Twin

Footnotes
Notes

References

Further reading
 Brugger, P; Regard, M; Landis, T. (1996). Unilaterally Felt ‘‘Presences’’: The Neuropsychiatry of One’s Invisible Doppelgänger. Neuropsychiatry, Neuropsychology, and Behavioral Neurology 9: 114–122.
 Keppler, C. F. (1972). The Literature of the Second Self. University of Arizona Press.
 Maack, L. H; Mullen, P. E. (1983). The Doppelgänger, Disintegration and Death: A Case Report. Psychological Medicine 13: 651–654.
 Miller, K. (1985). Doubles: Studies in Literary History. Oxford University Press.
 Rank, O. (1971, originally published in German, Der Doppelgänger, 1914). The Double: A Psychoanalytic Study. The University of North Carolina Press.
 Prel, Carl du, Die monistische Seelenlehre, Beitrag zur Lösung des Menschenrätsels, Leipzig, Günthers Verlag, 1888.
 Reed, G. F. (1987). Doppelgänger. In Gregory R. L. The Oxford Companion to the Mind. Oxford University Press. pp. 200–201.
 Todd, J; Dewhurst, K. (1962). The Significance of the Doppelgänger (Hallucinatory Double) in Folklore and Neuropsychiatry. Practitioner 188: 377–382.
 Todd, J; Dewhurst, K. (1955). The Double: Its Psycho-Pathology and Psycho-Physiology. Journal of Nervous and Mental Disease 122: 47–55.
 Hill, David A. How I Met Myself''. Cambridge, U.K.: Cambridge University Press, 2001.

External links
 
 Grimm's Saga No. 260 in which a Doppelgaenger appears as Married Woman
 Prometheus Unbound: Text at Barbleby.com

European ghosts
Literary concepts
Counterparts